The Supreme Court Metro Station (erstwhile called Pragati Maidan metro station) is located on the Blue Line of the Delhi Metro.  It services the Supreme Court of India, Pragati Maidan Exhibition center and the nearby ITO office area.

Station layout

Facilities
List of available ATM at Dwarka Sector 14 metro station: Canara Bank, Punjab National Bank.

Connections

See also
List of Delhi Metro stations
Transport in Delhi
Pragati Maidan railway station

References

External links

 Delhi Metro Rail Corporation Ltd. (Official site) 
 Delhi Metro Annual Reports
 

Delhi Metro stations
Railway stations opened in 2006
2006 establishments in Delhi
Railway stations in New Delhi district